The 1997 Leeds Rhinos season was the 102nd season in the club's rugby league history and the second season in the Super League. Coached by Dean Bell, the Rhinos competed in Super League II and finished in 5th place. The club also competed in the 1997 Challenge Cup, but were knocked out in the semi finals by Bradford Bulls.

Table

Squad

Transfers

In

Out

References

External links
Official site: Rhinos Statistics
Leeds Rhinos - Rugby League Project

Leeds Rhinos seasons
Leeds Rhinos
Rugby